Montevideo units are a method of measuring uterine performance during labor. They were created in 1949 by two physicians, Roberto Caldeyro-Barcia and Hermogenes Alvarez, from Montevideo, Uruguay. They are exactly equal to 1 mmHg within 10 minutes. A standard adequate measurement is 200; this is generally equivalent to 27 kPa of combined pressure change within 10 minutes.

Units are directly equal to pressure change in mmHg summed over a ten-minute window. It is calculated by internally (not externally) measuring peak uterine pressure amplitude (in mmHg), subtracting the resting tone of the contraction, and adding up the numbers in a 10-minute period. Uterine pressure is generally measured through an intrauterine pressure catheter.

Montevideo units can be more simply calculated by summing the individual contraction intensities in a ten-minute period, a process which should arrive at a result identical to the original method of calculation.

Generally, above 200 MVUs is considered necessary for adequate labor during the active phase.

Example
If, for instance:
 Peak uterine pressure amplitudes were 50 mmHg
 during the 10 minute period of measurement 3 contractions occurred
 subtract the resting tone from the peak intensity of the contraction
 add the 3 contractions together to get the MVUs
 Montevideo units are calculated by obtaining the peak uterine pressure amplitude and subtracting the resting tone. Then adding up those numbers generated by each contraction within a 10-minute window. 
 For example, five contractions occurred, producing peak pressures of 55, 50, 45, 65, and 50 mm Hg, respectively. The resting tone of the contractions is 10. 
55-10 = 45
50-10 = 40
45-10 = 35
65-10 = 55
50-10 = 40

45+40+35+55+40 = 215 MVUs

References

External links
 eMedicine

Obstetrics
Units of measurement